Brian Wilsterman (born 19 November 1966) is a Dutch footballer who played in The Football League for Oxford United and Rotherham United.

References

Dutch footballers
Surinamese emigrants to the Netherlands
Eredivisie players
Eerste Divisie players
NEC Nijmegen players
Go Ahead Eagles players
Oxford United F.C. players
FC Dordrecht players
Rotherham United F.C. players
English Football League players
Dutch expatriate footballers
Expatriate footballers in England
Dutch expatriate sportspeople in England
1966 births
Living people
Sportspeople from Paramaribo
Association football defenders